Knox District School No. 5 is a historic one-room school building located within Thompson's Lake State Park in the town of Knox in Albany County, New York.  It was built in 1898 and is a one-story  rectangular frame building on a dry laid stone foundation.  School use ceased in 1940, and it has been vacant since 1999.

It was listed on the National Register of Historic Places in 2005.

References

School buildings on the National Register of Historic Places in New York (state)
School buildings completed in 1898
Schools in Albany County, New York
National Register of Historic Places in Albany County, New York